Daily Dunya is an Urdu daily newspaper from Pakistan. It was launched on 3 September 2012 by National Communication Services from Lahore.  It is published simultaneously from Karachi, Lahore,  Faisalabad, Gujranwala, Multan, Quetta and  Sargodha. Daily Dunya launched Sheikh Rasheed Ahmad second book "Lal Haveli Sey Akwaam-e-Mutahidda Tak" (From Lal Haveli to UNO).

It is owned by Mian Amer Mahmood who is also the owner of Dunya News and Lahore News HD.

References

External links 
 
 Dunya ePaper's Roznama Dunya

2012 establishments in Pakistan
Newspapers established in 2012
Urdu-language newspapers published in Pakistan
Daily newspapers published in Pakistan
Mass media in Lahore